Pippa Mann (born 11 August 1983) is a British racing car driver, who competes in the IndyCar Series. She was born in London, United Kingdom.

Career

Formula Renault 

Mann began her career in 2003, after signing a three-race contract with Manor Motorsport to race in the winter series of the British Formula Renault Championship.

In 2004, she signed with Team JVA and completed a full season. She also competed a European Formula Renault event in Zolder.

In 2005, she signed a two-year contract to drive for Comtec Racing in the Formula Renault Eurocup as well as racing in that year's French Formula Renault 2.0 series. Pippa partnered Westley Barber for the UK based team and learnt a lot during the year.

In 2006, she raced in the UK Formula Renault 2.0 Championship as well as the Eurocup again for race team Comtec Racing, continuing the partnership with John Barnett and Murdoch Cockburn.

In January 2007, Mann signed for Cram by P1 Europe to become the first female to race in the Formula Renault 3.5 Series. In her debut year she managed to score a point and also start from pole position. She competed in the Formula Renault 3.5 Series in 2008 as well, still driving for P1 Motorsport team.

Indy Lights 

Mann signed to drive for Panther Racing in the 2009 Indy Lights series, the development series for the IndyCar Series.

During her debut season with Panther Racing, Mann scored a string of top-15 finishes, including three top-ten results. However a decision to close the Panther Racing Indy Lights team left her without a 2010 drive.

In December 2009, after deciding to remain in Indianapolis and find a place in another team, Mann confirmed that she would be joining Sam Schmidt Motorsports for the 2010 Indy Lights series. In 2010, she became the first female pole sitter for a race at the Indianapolis Motor Speedway by heading the grid for the Indy Lights Freedom 100, and won her first race at Kentucky Speedway.

IndyCar Series 

On 1 March 2011, Mann tested for the Indianapolis-based IndyCar Series team Conquest Racing at Texas Motor Speedway, and on 19 April, she announced that she would be piloting the No. 36 entry for Conquest Racing in the 2011 Indianapolis 500. On Sunday, 22 May, (Bump Day) Mann qualified 32nd for the 2011 Indianapolis 500, becoming the first British woman ever to qualify for the 500-mile race. During the race, she moved up 12 positions to finish in 20th place, despite a mechanical problem with her on-board water supply that left her severely dehydrated by the end of the race. She was sponsored in the race by Armando Montelongo, former star of the television show Flip This House.

On 13 August 2011, during the final day of practice for the MoveThatBlock.com Indy 225 at New Hampshire Motor Speedway, Mann crashed and suffered an end-plate fracture of the C7 vertebra, but competed on 2 October in the Kentucky Indy 300.

On 16 October 2011, Mann was involved in a 15 car chain reaction crash at Las Vegas Motor Speedway. She sustained severe burns to her right little finger and was transported by ground ambulance to UMC Southern Nevada, where she was admitted for treatment and released the next day, pending later surgery. The crash claimed the life of two-time winner of the Indianapolis 500 Dan Wheldon, and also sent J. R. Hildebrand to hospital with a bruised sternum.

In 2012, Mann was close to attempt qualifying at the Indianapolis 500 for Dale Coyne Racing. The team signed her as third driver for the 2013 edition.

In 2013, Mann finished 30th (out of 33) in the 97th annual Indianapolis 500, completing 46 of 200 laps. She also signed on to make 3 more large oval race starts with Dale Coyne Racing.

In 2014, Mann qualified in 22nd position for the 98th Indianapolis 500 as the only female driver in the field and finished 24th (again out of 33) for Dale Coyne Racing and in partnership with Susan G. Komen. The partnership allowed race fans to donate for each lap Mann completed during the month of May, in support of ending breast cancer. Although encountering an issue during one of the early pit stops, she completed 484 total laps for the month and finished the entire race.

In 2015, Mann returned to the Dale Coyne Racing Team for the 99th Indianapolis 500. She qualified 25th for her 4th appearance with a 4 lap average speed of 223.104 mph, starting from the inside of row 9. Mann finished in 22nd place, racing for the Susan G. Komen cancer outreach organization again for the second year in a row.

After having a successful race at Indy and raising over 50,000 dollars for cancer, Mann was then asked to race again for the Dale Coyne Racing Team recalling her for the 6 June Firestone 600. Starting from the 22nd position, she took 17th place at the Texas Motor Speedway. The Dale Coyne Racing team continued changing drivers on a race-by-race basis throughout the season, with their No. 18 car recalling Mann for the remaining oval tracks. She started 22nd and finished 13th on the lead lap at the 2015 MAVTV 500 at the Auto Club Speedway. It was the best finish for the No. 18 car mid way through the season for the team and one of Mann's best results in her career, since re-joining IndyCar in 2013. 

In 2016, Mann was highly recognized for her achievements, both on and off the IndyCar racing circuit. She was selected by the Susan G. Komen foundation to be on "The List", along with former First Ladies Laura Bush and Betty Ford, and 29 other key public figures, for their efforts and support in fighting breast cancer. After finishing a career-best 18th place in the 100th running of the Indianapolis 500, Mann was also named by Autocar as one of the top 100 British Women in the Car Industry.

In 2017, Mann qualified 28th for the running of the 101st Indianapolis 500, and finished midway through the pack of 33 drivers in 17th place. Just prior to qualifying on Fast Friday, Mann also became the first women to break the 230 mph barrier around the Indianapolis Motor Speedway by posting a speed record of 230.103 mph, per TrackSide Online.  Mann also competed in the 2017 North America Lamborghini Super Trofeo Championship series, in which drivers compete in identical Lamborghini Cup cars based on the Lamborghini Huracán LP 620-2.

On March 20, 2018, Mann announced she would attempt to compete in her seventh Indianapolis 500 for Dale Coyne Racing. Ultimately, she was bumped from the field. She did qualify in 30th position for the 2019 Indianapolis 500 for Clauson-Marshall Racing, going on to record her best-ever finish in the race in 16th. She could not find sponsors to enter the 2020 Indianapolis 500.

Mann has also been a past commentator for IndyCar Radio on the IndyCar Series and Indy Lights series. She also works as a driver coach.

Personal life
In December 2012, Mann married Robert Gue, an engineer at Schmidt Peterson Motorsports who is the former race strategist for James Hinchcliffe.

Racing record

Career summary

Formula Renault 3.5 Series results
(key) (Races in bold indicate pole position) (Races in italics indicate fastest lap)

American open-wheel racing results
(key) (Races in bold indicate pole position)

Indy Lights

IndyCar Series

 * Season still in progress

 1 The Las Vegas Indy 300 was abandoned after Dan Wheldon died from injuries sustained in a 15-car crash on lap 11.

 ** Podium (Non-win) indicates 2nd or 3rd place finishes.
 *** Top 10s (Non-podium) indicates 4th through 10th place finishes.

Indianapolis 500

Complete 24 Hours of Nürburgring results

Sponsors 
Pippa Mann is sponsored by Bell Helmets, Cyclops Gear,  RockStar Paint, The momentum Group, Hinchman Racing, ORTHOINDY, Oasis Outdoor and Dale Coyne Racing.

References

External links
Official website
Pippa Mann at Driver Database
IndyCar Driver Page

1983 births
Living people
Sportspeople from London
English racing drivers
British Formula Renault 2.0 drivers
Formula Renault Eurocup drivers
Indianapolis 500 drivers
World Series Formula V8 3.5 drivers
French Formula Renault 2.0 drivers
Indy Lights drivers
IndyCar Series drivers
Female IndyCar Series drivers
Auto GP drivers
Porsche Carrera Cup GB drivers
English female racing drivers
Manor Motorsport drivers
Comtec Racing drivers
Cram Competition drivers
P1 Motorsport drivers
Arrow McLaren SP drivers
Panther Racing drivers
Conquest Racing drivers
Rahal Letterman Lanigan Racing drivers
Campos Racing drivers
Dale Coyne Racing drivers
Nürburgring 24 Hours drivers
Mumbai Falcons drivers